Horsfield's bat (Myotis horsfieldii) is a species of vesper bat. It is found in China, India, Indonesia, Malaysia, Myanmar, the Philippines, Thailand, and Vietnam.

References

Mouse-eared bats
Taxonomy articles created by Polbot
Taxa named by Coenraad Jacob Temminck
Mammals described in 1840
Bats of Asia